A state transition network is a diagram that is developed from a set of data and charts the flow of data from particular data points (called states or nodes) to the next in a probabilistic manner.

Use
State transition networks are used in both academic and industrial fields.

Examples
State transition networks are a general construct, with more specific examples being augmented transition networks, recursive transition networks, and augmented recursive networks, among others.

See also
 State transition system
 Markov network
 History monoid

References

Data management